Dennis Wise Okoth is a retired Kenyan midfielder who featured for Kenyan Premier League sides Nairobi City Stars, Gor Mahia F.C. and Sony Sugar. He is currently a local and school coach.

Career

Player
Okoth first turned out for World Hope since its inception in 2003 and was part of the squad that promoted the side to the Kenyan Premier League in the 2004/5 season. He was at the club till 2008 season and extended his stay for another two seasons in 2009 and 2010 after the club was rechristened Nairobi City Stars.

He then moved to Gor Mahia F.C. in 2011
 and then to Sony Sugar in the 2012 season. He returned to Nairobi City Stars in 2013 and 2014 before calling it a day at the end of that season.

Coaching

After active playing, he stayed on at City Stars as assistant coach in 2015, sometimes as interim coach, and in 2016 when the team was relegated. He served as the City Stars U-20 coach in 2016 team. He currently coaches his childhood team Dagoretti Santos F.C. and Rusinga School where is engaged as a Soccer coach.

Honours

Club
World Hope
 KFF Nationwide Champion: (2004) 
 FKF President's Cup: (2005)

Individual
Nairobi City Stars
 Fair Play player of the year (2009): KPL Awards

References

External links
 

Living people
Kenyan footballers
Nairobi City Stars players
Gor Mahia F.C. players
SoNy Sugar F.C. players
Kenyan Premier League players
Association football midfielders
1982 births